This is a comparison of data serialization formats, various ways to convert complex objects to sequences of bits. It does not include markup languages used exclusively as document file formats.

Overview

Syntax comparison of human-readable formats

Comparison of binary formats

See also
Comparison of document-markup languages

References

External links
XML-QL Proposal discussing XML benefits
Daring to Do Less with XML

Data serialization formats
Persistence
Data-serialization formats